The United States women's national tennis team is the most successful national team in Billie Jean King Cup competition.  The team has won 18 titles and finished second a further 11 times, out of 55 participations.

History
The United States won the inaugural Billie Jean King Cup, originally known as the Federation Cup and later as the Fed Cup, in 1963.  They hold the record for most ties won, with 149, including 37 in a row.  They won seven straight titles between 1976 and 1982.

Members of the inaugural team
Darlene Hard
Carole Graebner
Billie Jean King

Teams

External links

Billie Jean King Cup teams
Billie Jean King Cup
Billie Jean King